The 1921 SNETA Farman Goliath ditching occurred on 26 August 1921 when a Farman F.60 Goliath of Syndicat National d'Étude des Transports Aériens ditched in the North Sea off the coast of Belgium. The aircraft was operating a mail flight from Croydon Airport, United Kingdom to Brussels-Evere Airport, Belgium. The aircraft was later salvaged, repaired and returned to service.

Aircraft and crew
The accident aircraft was Farman F.60 Goliath O-BLAN, msn 7248/17. The crew consisted of pilot Paul Delsenne, a French Air Force aviator, and mechanic Raymond Rijckers.

Ditching
The aircraft, operated by Syndicat National d'Étude des Transports Aériens (SNETA), was operating a mail flight from Croydon Airport, United Kingdom to Brussels-Evere Airport, Belgium. It had departed from Croydon at 12:25.
The accident was reported by the Gendarme by telegraph to Calais. The report was passed on to the Gendarmerie at Boulogne and Gravelines. Various fishing boats, yachts and submarines were dispatched to search for the aircraft. The accident was also witnessed by Herbert Sullivan, on board the yacht Zola. He sent a radiogram reporting the accident. A bag of mail was recovered by Sullivan, it was subsequently forwarded to authorities in Brussels. The South Eastern and Chatham Railway ship  received the radiogram and relayed it to the General Post Office in London. The wreckage of the aircraft was later reported by the steamship  to be off the coast of Belgium. Both crew, pilot and mechanic, were reported as missing. The accident was the first involving the Farman Goliath in civil service. The aircraft was subsequently recovered and repaired, returning to service in 1923.

References

Aviation accidents and incidents in 1921
Aviation accidents and incidents in France
1921 in France
1921 disasters in Europe
1921 disasters in France